Bezel may refer to:

Object
 Bezel (jewellery), the rim which encompasses and fastens a jewel, watch crystal, lens or other object
 Bezel, the sloping facets of the crown of a cut gem after gem cutting
 Screen bezel, a space or frame around a display device, such as on a television or mobile device
 Bezel, the removable plastic faceplate or front panel of a slot, such as on an optical disc drive

Other uses
 Jay Bezel (born 1983), American rapper

See also
 Bazel (disambiguation)